Facundo Imhoff (born ) is an Argentine male volleyball player. He was part of the Argentina men's national volleyball team. On club level he played for Lindaren Volley Amriswil.

In August 2019 he publicly came out as gay.

References

External links
 profile at FIVB.org
Player profile at Volleybox.net

1989 births
Living people
Gay sportsmen
Argentine men's volleyball players
Place of birth missing (living people)
Pan American Games gold medalists for Argentina
Universiade medalists in volleyball
Universiade medalists for Argentina
Argentine LGBT sportspeople
Argentine gay men
Pan American Games medalists in volleyball
Volleyball players at the 2019 Pan American Games
Medalists at the 2015 Summer Universiade
Medalists at the 2019 Pan American Games